Pheta, also known as pataka, is a traditional turban worn in Maharashtra, India.

In ceremonies such as weddings, as well as other festive, cultural, and religious celebrations, it is common to wear pheta. In many areas it is customary to offer male dignitaries a traditional welcome by offering them a pheta to wear. The fabric of the pheta is draped around the head in 6 to 7 rounds, with a small piece of fabric hanging loose like a tail, called the shemala. Some phetas are plain and single-colored, whereas some are lined and double-colored. The choice of color may indicate the occasion for which it is being worn and also may be typical to the place it is being worn in. Typical colors include saffron (to indicate valour) and white (to indicate peace). In the past, wearing a pheta was considered a mandatory part of clothing.

Varieties
Other than the traditional white and saffron pheta, there are two other major varieties. One is the famous Kolhapuri pheta, which comes in a multitude of colours and has a Bandhani effect on it. The other major variety consists of the Puneri pheta which comes with checkered patterns and has a distinct gold border. A variety of pheta is usually named after a town from which it was made, popularized, or worn; for example, the Kohlapuri pheta is named after the town Kolhapur

Styles
There are different styles of draping a pheta related to the place where it is being worn, the context, and even famous personalities. Geographic styles include: the Kolhapuri style, Mawali style, Puneri style, Lahiri style, and many more. On the other hand, style and varieties are also connected to distinguished persons who wore a pheta, such as Shahi, Mahatma Gandhi, Tukaram Maharaj, and many others.

Innovations
Often the traditional phetas are given a more westernized version that is more colorful, reversible, adjustable, and come in different metallic and satin fabrics as opposed to cotton.

Global appeal
Several Indian celebrities and political leaders have worn the Marathi Pheta in different forms which has given this head dress a global appeal and has made an impact on several people worldwide. Several fashion designers have imitated the style of the Marathi Pheta and have used it to give their collection a touch of Indian ethnicity. Among all the different varieties of Phetas, the Puneri Pheta has been universally considered as the most auspicious one that is handed over during the nuptials of a wedding. Gradually, this age old tradition of Pheta became an auspicious ritual for people, be it any culture.

In media
Many of Marathi movies that portray historical Maharashtran figures, such as Netaji Palkar, Ayodhyecha Raja, Shree Pundalik, depict the character sporting a pheta in most of the scenes. Some  Bollywood actors, including Abhishek Bachchan and Ritesh Deshmukh, wore the pheta on their wedding day. Bachchan's father, Amitabh Bachchan, also wore a pheta on his son's wedding.

Gallery

See also
Turban

References

Indian headgear
Marathi clothing
Indian wedding clothing
Desi culture